Ewiger Wald is a 1936 German film directed by Hanns Springer and Rolf von Sonjevski-Jamrowski. The film's international English title was Enchanted Forest.

Commissioned by Alfred Rosenberg's cultural organization Militant League for German Culture in 1934 under the working title Deutscher Wald–Deutsches Schicksal (German Forest – German Destiny), the feature-length movie premiered in Munich in 1936. Intended as a cinematic proof for the shared destiny of the German woods and the German people beyond the vicissitudes of history, it portrayed a perfect symbiosis of an eternal forest and a likewise eternal people firmly rooted in it between Neolithic and National Socialist times.

Plot summary 

In accordance with Rosenberg's anti-Christian beliefs, the first section on prehistory displayed various customs and rituals of an asserted pagan forest religion like a maypole dance or funerals in treetrunk coffins. Further, it depicted the forest sheltering ancient Germanic tribes, Arminius, and the Teutonic Knights, facing the German Peasants' War, being chopped up by war and industry, and being humiliated by black soldiers brought into Germany by the French occupation army. The years of the Weimar Republic appeared to be disastrous for people and forest alike. The film culminated in a National Socialist May Day celebration filmed at the Berlin Lustgarten.

Cast 
Günther Hadank (voice)
Heinz Herkommer (voice)
Paul Klinger (voice)
Lothar Körner (voice)
Aribert Mog
Kurt Wieschala (voice)

References

Further reading 
 Meder,Thomas. “Die Deutschen als Wald-Volk. Der Kulturfilm EWIGER WALD (1936).” in: Il bosco nella cultura europea tra realtá e immaginario, ed. Guili Liebman Parrinello, 105-129. Rom: Bulzoni, 2002.
 Wilke, Sabine. “'Verrottet, verkommen, von fremder Rasse durchsetzt'. The Colonial Trope as Subtext of the Nazi-'Kulturfilm' EWIGER WALD (1936).” German Studies Review 24 (2001): 353-376.
 Zechner, Johannes. “Wald, Volksgemeinschaft und Geschichte: Die Parallelisierung natürlicher und sozialer Ordnungen im NSKG-Kulturfilm EWIGER WALD (1936).” in: Kulturfilm im „Dritten Reich“, ed. Ramón Reichert, 109-118. Wien: Synema, 2006.
 Zechner, Johannes. “Politicized Timber: The 'German Forest' and the Nature of the Nation 1800-1945.” The Brock Review 11.2 (2011): 19-32.

External links 

1936 documentary films
1936 films
1930s German-language films
German black-and-white films
Nazi propaganda films
Films based on poems
German documentary films
Films of Nazi Germany
Black-and-white documentary films
Films about neopaganism
Paganism in Europe
1930s German films